There are eight ports in the south of Iran and three in the north. The following is the list of ports in Iran.

North 
 Caspian Port — Gilan province
 Amirabad Port — Mazandaran province, largest port on the coast of the Caspian Sea

South 
 Port of Shahid Rajaee — Hormozgan Province
 Chabahar Port — Sistan and Baluchestan Province

References

 
ports